= Gonaičiai =

Coordinates: 56°16′20″N 21°47′28″E

- Interactive map of Gonaičiai
- Country: Lithuania
- Municipality: Skuodas District Municipality
- Eldership: Ylakių Eldership

Population (2021)
  - Total: 34

Gonaičiai is a village in the Skuodas District Municipality, northwest of the town of Ylakiai, in Lithuania. In 2006, there were 17 homesteads.

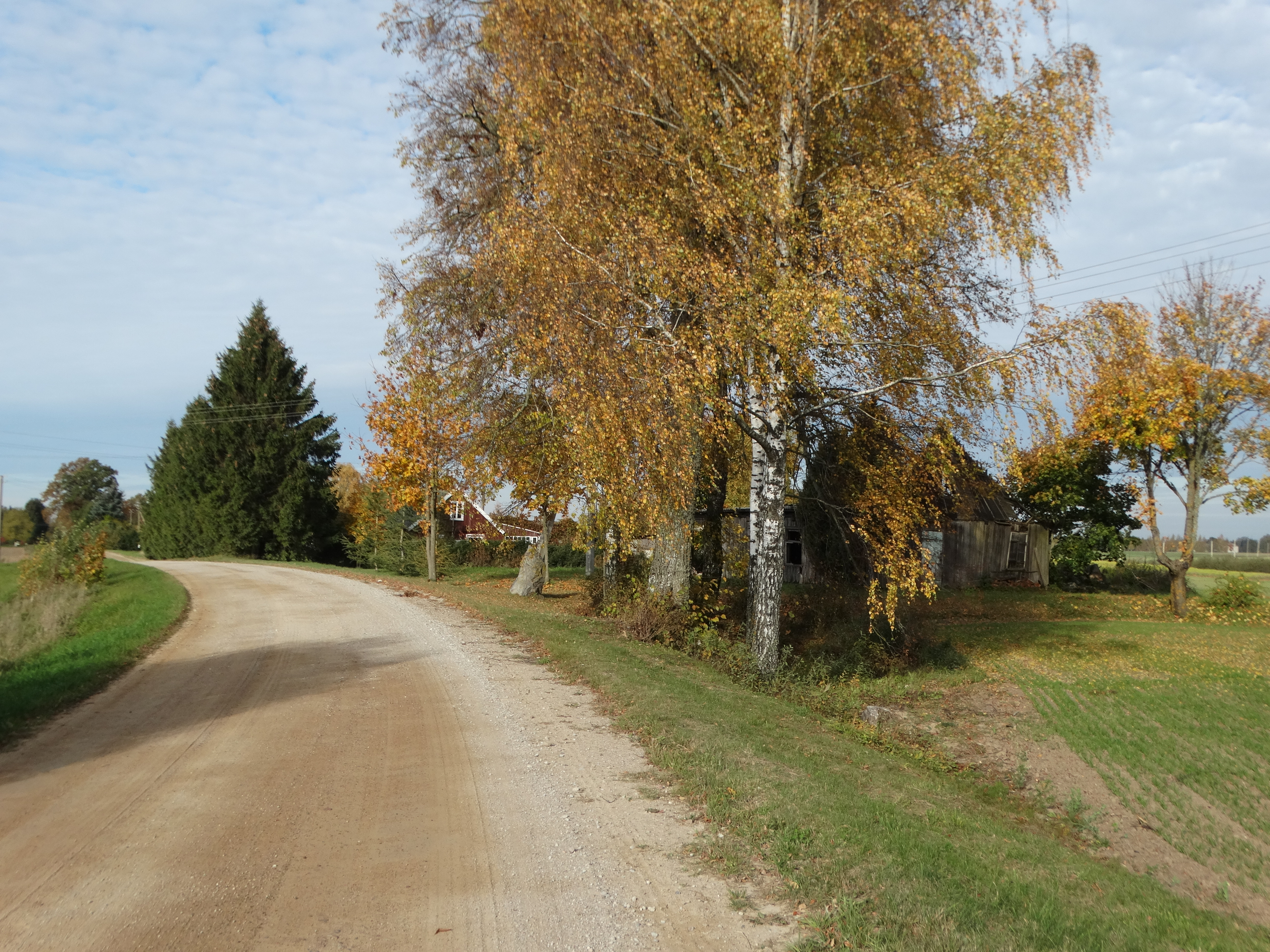
Roadside homesteads

== History ==
In 1923, a primary school was established, with Marcelė Raštikytė as its first teacher. The school operated until 1970, employing a total of 12 educators over its history.

In 1923, Gonaičiai had 51 homesteads and 269 residents; by 1927, there were 60 homesteads. In 1949, the founding meeting of a collective farm was held at the Petrikai homestead, leading to the establishment of the "Žalgiris" collective farm.

== Population ==
The population is estimated to be 34 as of 2021.
